Dancing on the Moon is a 1935 animated film directed by Dave Fleischer and part of the Color Classics series of animated short films produced by Fleischer Studios.

According to animation historian Jerry Beck, this film probably contains the first example of the dance move "moonwalk".

Plot summary 
"Honeymoon Express to the Moon" offers a ride for one dollar per couple. Passengers embark on the spaceship: cattle, penguins, elephants, bears and giraffes. A cat couple arriving late is split up at the takeoff and the female is left behind. On the ship, the cat plays solitaire with cards.

While on the Moon, the eight couples find private places to smooch. While at the base of the female giraffe's neck, the male comments "This is a great place for necking" to which the female (in a Mae West impression) retorts "Why don't you come up and see me sometime?" The cat plays cat's cradle. When the other couples dance, the cat dances a moonwalk.

When arriving back on Earth, the couples get deliveries from the stork but the cat does not. He is reunited with his bride who then physically abuses him.

Notes

References

External links 
 
 

1935 animated films
1935 short films
American animated short films
1930s English-language films
1930s American animated films
Short films directed by Dave Fleischer
Color Classics cartoons
Moon in film
Animated films about cats
Paramount Pictures short films